Pseudidonauton nigribasis is a species of moth of the family Limacodidae. It is found in India.

References 

Limacodidae
Moths described in 1905
Moths of Asia